Myra Cohen may refer to:
Myra Cohen (dental assistant) (1892–1959), early New Zealander
Myra B. Cohen, American software engineer educated in New Zealand
Myra Cohen, writer for 1970s US children's television show That's Cat
Myra Cohen, second wife of British businessman Eric Miller (businessman) (1926–1977)
Myra Cohen, wife of Argentinian-American interfaith advocate León Klenicki (1930–2009)
Myra Cohen, councilwoman in Newington, Connecticut, namesake of access road for Cedar Street station
Myra Cohen, fictional character played by Debra Mooney in television series Chance